Ride height or ground clearance is the amount of space between the base of an automobile tire and the lowest point of the automobile (typically the axle); or, more properly, to the shortest distance between a flat, level surface, and the lowest part of a vehicle other than those parts designed to contact the ground (such as tires, tracks, skis, etc.). Ground clearance is measured with standard vehicle equipment, and for cars, is usually given with no cargo or passengers.

Function 
Ground clearance is a critical factor in several important characteristics of a vehicle. For all vehicles, especially cars, variations in clearance represent a trade-off between handling, ride quality, and practicality.

A higher ride height and ground clearance means that the wheels have more vertical room to travel and absorb road shocks. Also, the car is more capable of being driven on roads that are not level, without the scraping against surface obstacles and possibly damaging the chassis and underbody.

For a higher ride height, the center of mass of the car is higher, which makes for less precise and more dangerous handling characteristics (most notably, the chance of rollover is higher). Higher ride heights will typically adversely affect aerodynamic properties. This is why sports cars typically have very low clearances, while off-road vehicles and SUVs have higher ones.

Example ride heights 
Two well-known extremes are the Ferrari F40 with a  ride height and the Hummer H2 with a  ride height.

The table below provides average ride height for different car types which were available on the market in India in 2020:

Specialized uses

Underslung frame
Some cars have used underslung frames to achieve a lower ride height and the consequent improvement in center of gravity. The 1905-14 cars of the American Motor Car Company are one example.

Self-leveling
Self-leveling suspension systems are designed to maintain a constant ride height regardless of load. The suspension detects the load via mechanical or electronic means and raises or lowers the vehicle, by inflating cylinders in the suspension to lift the chassis higher. Vehicles not equipped with self-leveling will pitch down at one end when laden; this adversely affects ride, handling, and aerodynamic properties.

Height adjustable
Some modern automobiles (such as the Audi Allroad Quattro and Tesla Model S) have height adjustable suspension, which can vary the ride height by adjusting the hydropneumatic suspension or air suspension. This adjustment can be automatic, depending on road conditions, and/or the settings selected by the driver.

Adjustable shock absorber
Other, simpler suspension systems, such as coilover springs, offer a way of manually adjusting ride height (and often, spring stiffness) by compressing the spring in situ, using a threaded shaft and adjustable knob or nut.

Aftermarket
Lowering a car's suspension is a common and relatively inexpensive aftermarket modification. Many car enthusiasts prefer the more aggressive look of a lowered body, and there is an easily realized car handling improvement from the lower center of gravity. Most passenger cars are produced such that one or two inches of lowering will not significantly increase the probability of damage. On most automobiles, ride height is modified by changing the length of the suspension springs, and is the essence of many aftermarket suspension kits supplied by manufacturers such as Eibach and H&R.

Military
For armored fighting vehicles (AFV), ground clearance presents an additional factor in a vehicle's overall performance: a lower ground clearance means that the vehicle minus the chassis is lower to the ground and thus harder to spot and harder to hit. The final design of any AFV reflects a compromise between being a smaller target on one hand, and having greater battlefield mobility on the other. Very few AFVs have top speeds at which car-like handling becomes an issue, though rollovers can and do occur. By contrast, an AFV is far more likely to need high ground clearance than a road vehicle.

Trucks

18-wheel tractor-trailers also have to take the ground clearance of both their tractor and especially trailer into consideration on certain areas of uneven terrain, such as raised railroad crossings. Their extremely long wheelbase means that such terrain could potentially catch the undercarriage of the trailer in the wide space between the axles, potentially leaving the truck stuck with no means to extricate itself.

Buses
In some areas buses are required to have a ground clearance of at least . Too much ride height can cause the vehicle to have an excessively high center of gravity, which could cause the vehicle to be unstable or even flip.

See also

 Approach and departure angles
 Body lift
 Breakover angle
 Center of mass, automotive applications 
 Clearance
 Height adjustable suspension
 Loading gauge
 Speed bump
 Suspension lift
 Lowrider
 Turning diameter

References

Automotive engineering
Road safety